Russell Alger Memorial Fountain is a Detroit, Michigan fountain, one of the "most successful collaborations" created by the sculptor, Daniel Chester French and architect Henry Bacon.  The bronze statue was cast by the Gorham Manufacturing Company.   It is located in Grand Circus Park and was dedicated on July 27, 1921.

The Beaux-Arts styled bronze monument consists of a "spirited" female personification of "Michigan" with one hand raised in greeting while the other holds a sword and shield.  The crest of the state of Michigan is on the shield in shallow relief. There is a bas relief portrait of Alger on the granite base. Lion heads on the base serve as founts to pour water into the surrounding bowl.

Russell Alger (1836–1907) was a Civil War veteran (he enlisted as a private and ended the war as a general), politician (Governor of Michigan, U.S. Senator from Michigan, and U.S. Secretary of War), and a very successful businessman. Following Alger's death a "memorial society" of Civil War veterans convened and commissioned the work.

References

External links 

Michigan in the American Civil War
Monuments and memorials in Detroit
1921 sculptures
Sculptures by Daniel Chester French
1921 in Detroit